Kyles is an extinct town in Wayne County, in the U.S. state of Missouri.

A post office called Kyles was established in 1892, and remained in operation until 1933. "Kyles" may have been the name of an early postmaster, according to local history.

References

Ghost towns in Missouri
Former populated places in Wayne County, Missouri